Spot the difference is a type of puzzle where players must find a set number of differences between two otherwise similar images.

Description 
Spot the difference games are found in various media including activity books for children, newspapers, and video games. They are a type of puzzle where players must find a set number of differences between two otherwise similar images, whether they are illustrations or photographs that have been altered with photo manipulation.

Solving techniques 
Visual comparison may be used to solve the puzzle. The solution to the puzzle is often listed nearby or in an accompanying answer page of a puzzle book. Additionally, one can cross one's eyes and merge the two pictures into one, in the much the same way as when viewing an autostereogram picture. The differences will appear to blink in and out of one's vision. This is a very effective method of solving these puzzles.

See also 
 Photo Hunt

Puzzles
Stereoscopy
Difference